Mayoral elections in Irvine, California, are held every two years.

The first direct-election for mayor in the city’s history was held in 1988. All such elections have been held under state laws that make municipal elections in California officially non-partisan.

1988 Irvine mayoral election 

The 1988 mayoral election, held on June 7, was the first direct-election for mayor in the city's history. Larry Agran was re-elected.

1990 Irvine mayoral election 

The 1990 election was held on June 5, 1990. Sally Anne Sheridan unseated incumbent mayor Larry Agran.

1992 Irvine mayoral election 

The 1992 mayoral election, held on November 3, was the first Irvine mayoral election to be consolidated with the statewide general election (the two previous direct mayoral elections had instead been held coinciding with the statewide primary elections). Mike Ward was elected.

1994 Irvine mayoral election 

The 1994 mayoral election was held on November 8. Mike Ward, who ran unopposed, was re-elected.

1996 Irvine mayoral election 

The 1996 mayoral election was held on November 5. Christina L. Shea was elected.

1998 Irvine mayoral election 

The 1998 mayoral election was held on November 3. Christina L. Shea, who ran unopposed, was re-elected.

2000 Irvine mayoral election 

The 2000 mayoral election was held on November 7. Larry Agran, who had previously served as two terms as mayor, ran unopposed and was elected.

2002 Irvine mayoral election 

The 2002 mayoral election was held on November 5. Larry Agran was re-elected.

2004 Irvine mayoral election 

The 2004 mayoral election was held on November 2. Beth Krom was elected. Among the candidates defeated by Krom was former mayor Mike Ward.

2006 Irvine mayoral election 

The 2006 mayoral electionwas held on November 7. Beth Krom was re-elected.

2008 Irvine mayoral election 

The 2010 mayoral election was held on November 4. Sukhee Kang was elected, becoming the first Korean American mayor of a major U.S. city. He defeated former mayor Christina L. Shea.

2010 Irvine mayoral election 

The 2010 mayoral election was held on November 2. Sukhee Kang was re-elected.

2012 Irvine mayoral election 

The 2012 mayoral election was held on November 6. Steven Choi was elected.

2014 Irvine mayoral election 

The 2014 mayoral election was held on November 4. Steven Choi was re-elected.

2016 Irvine mayoral election 

The 2016 mayoral election was held on November 8. Donald P. Wagner was elected.

2018 Irvine mayoral election 

The 2018 mayoral election was held on November 6. Donald P. Wagner was re-elected.

2020 Irvine mayoral election 

The 2020 mayoral election was held on November 3. Mayor Pro Tem Christina Shea, who had taken office on April 13, 2019, when Mayor Donald P. Wagner vacated the seat after winning a special election to the Orange County Board of Supervisors, lost the seat to Councilwoman Farrah Khan, the first Democrat to be elected since 2010.

Declared candidates:
 Katherine Daigle, small business owner and perennial candidate (Party preference: Republican)
 Luis Huang, solar engineer and advocate. (Party preference: Democratic)
 Farrah Khan, business consultant and city council member. (Party preference: Democratic)
 Christina Shea, incumbent mayor and former city council member. (Party preference: Republican)

2022 Irvine mayoral election 

The 2022 mayoral election was held on November 8. Farrah Khan was re-elected.

References